Bernardus "Ben" Duijker (1 August 1903 – 9 December 1990) was a Dutch cyclist. He competed in the individual and team road race events at the 1928 Summer Olympics.

See also
 List of Dutch Olympic cyclists

References

External links
 

1903 births
1990 deaths
Dutch male cyclists
Olympic cyclists of the Netherlands
Cyclists at the 1928 Summer Olympics
Cyclists from Amsterdam